Deepak Mankar is a leader of National Congress Party.

References

Nationalist Congress Party politicians from Maharashtra
Marathi politicians
Maharashtra politicians
Year of birth missing (living people)
Living people